Metin Emre Karaal (born 15 January 2003) is a Turkish professional footballer who plays as a midfielder for Tepecikspor on loan from Süper Lig club İstanbul Başakşehir.

Professional career
A youth product of İstanbul Başakşehir, Karaal signed his first professional contract with the club on 9 January 2020. He made his senior debut with Başakşehir in a 2-0 Süper Lig win over Çaykur Rizespor on 15 May 2021.

On 5 January 2023, Karaal joined Tepecikspor on loan.

International career
Karaal is a youth international for Turkey, having represented the Turkey U15s.

References

External links
 
 

2003 births
People from Bayrampaşa
Footballers from Istanbul
Living people
Turkish footballers
Turkey youth international footballers
Association football midfielders
İstanbul Başakşehir F.K. players
Sarıyer S.K. footballers
Tepecikspor footballers
Süper Lig players
TFF Second League players
TFF Third League players